The mixed doubles tournament of the 2011 BWF World Championships (World Badminton Championships) was held from August 8 to 14. Zheng Bo and Ma Jin were the defending champions.
Zhang Nan and Zhao Yunlei won the title after defeating Chris Adcock and Imogen Bankier 21–15, 21–7 in the final.

Seeds

Draw

Finals

Section 1

Section 2

Section 3

Section 4

References
Main Draw

2011 BWF World Championships
World Championships